Graticula, formerly incorrectly named Craticula,  is a genus of Palaeozoic coralline alga.  They form the framework of reef rocks in the Silurian of Gotland, from the Högklint, Slite and Halla groups.

The Graticulaceae closely resemble the Cretaceous Solenoporaceae, and are only really differentiated by their stratigraphic position.

Graticula mineralized with calcite.

References

Fossil algae
Red algae genera